Henry Knollys of Downton, Hampshire, was a parliamentarian in England.

He was a Member of Parliament for St Ives in 1547.

References 

Year of birth unknown
Year of death unknown
English MPs 1547–1552
People from New Forest District
People from St Ives, Cornwall
Politicians from Portsmouth